Andrey Vovk (born November 22, 1991) is a Ukrainian chess Grandmaster (2009).

In 2008 he tied for 3rd–5th with Oganes Danielian and Evgeni Vasiukov in the Transkarpathian Cup in Mukachevo. In 2009 he was second in the Hogeschool Zeeland Chess Tournament in Vlissingen. In 2010 he came first at Rosenheim.

Vovk is the 19th best player in Ukraine. He is the younger brother of Yuri Vovk.

References

External links
 
 
 
 Andrey Vovk at Grandcoach.com

1991 births
Living people
Sportspeople from Lviv
Chess grandmasters
Ukrainian chess players